Eldivan District is a district of the Çankırı Province of Turkey. Its seat is the town of Eldivan. Its area is 350 km2, and its population is 5,977 (2021).

Composition
There is one municipality in Eldivan District:
 Eldivan

There are 16 villages in Eldivan District:

 Akbulut 
 Akçalı 
 Alva
 Büyükhacıbey 
 Çiftlikköy 
 Çukuröz 
 Elmacı 
 Gölez 
 Gölezkayı 
 Hisarcık 
 Hisarcıkkayı 
 Küçükhacıbey 
 Sarayköy 
 Sarıtarla 
 Seydiköy 
 Yukarıyanlar

References

Districts of Çankırı Province